The Bell Game is an annual football contest between two high schools in Pueblo, Colorado, USA: Centennial High School and Central High School. They have been playing each other since Thanksgiving Day 1892 in what is believed to be the oldest ongoing American football rivalry for high school teams west of the Mississippi River and the highest annual attendance for a high school sports event in Colorado, typically drawing 15,000 fans to Pueblo's Dutch Clark Stadium. The rivalry is sometimes referred to as the "One Hundred Year War". Since 1950, the teams have played for ownership of a railroad bell mounted upon a wheeled cart, along with the right to paint the cart the winning school's colors and keep the bell in the winning school for sporting events and school activities.  In years where the bell is transferred from one school to the other, the senior cheerleaders from the losing school wheel the bell to midfield at the conclusion of the game where it is handed over to the senior cheerleaders and players from the victorious school.  The bell's cart is repainted in the winning school's colors, with one small area retaining the color from the other school to symbolize the rivalry.

Decade-by-decade victories for each school:

As of the 2022 game, in the all-time series Central has 60 wins, Centennial has 53 wins, and the teams have tied 9 times.

In 1895 and 1896, Centennial and Central combined to form a single Pueblo high school team.

Centennial did not field a team in the 1901 or 1902 seasons, nor from 1913 to 1919.

The series was temporarily suspended after the 1907 game ended in a brawl between the two teams and their respective fan bases.

In many years the two teams would play twice each season: a regular season game, and then a special Thanksgiving Day game if neither team was playing in the state playoffs. The Thanksgiving Day games ended after the 1950 season.

References

High school sports rivalries in the United States
High school sports in Colorado
1892 establishments in Colorado
American football in Colorado
Sports in Pueblo, Colorado
Recurring sporting events established in 1892